Atlético Madrid opened a new chapter in its history with the appointment of Mexican coach Javier Aguirre, who had been successful managing Osasuna. With the club-record signing of superstarlet Sergio Agüero as well as Mariano Pernía and Raúl García, Atlético emulated at repeating Aguirre's recent feat of taking Osasuna to UEFA Champions League. The end result was 60 points, the best points haul in its five-season La Liga return, although this was not enough even for UEFA Cup qualification, which resulted in captain Fernando Torres departing for Liverpool, the transfer causing fury among the support. It was the sole season that he and Sergio Agüero played together.

Kit
In March 2006, Nike announced that the home kit for the forthcoming season will leave the usual stripes and feature halves instead, with the home kit consisting of halves in red and white and the away kit consisting of halves in navy blue and white. However, due to a massive negative reception from the fans, the club refused to use the red and white kit as their home choice. Finally, Nike decided to bring back the 2005–06 kit as their home choice, while both new kits will serve as away choices, depending on the color combinations used by the opposing team.

|
|
|

Squad

Goalkeepers
  Leo Franco
  Roberto
  Ismael Falcón
  Iván Cuéllar

Defenders
  Giourkas Seitaridis
  Antonio López
  Mariano Pernía
  Fabiano Eller
  Zé Castro
  Juan Valera
  Luis Perea
  Pablo

Midfielders
  Peter Luccin
  Costinha
  Luciano Galletti
  Gabi
  Maxi Rodríguez
  José Manuel Jurado
  Martin Petrov
  Miguel de las Cuevas
  Maniche
  Roberto Batres
  Víctor Bravo
  Pollo

Attackers
  Fernando Torres
  Sergio Agüero
  Mista
  Fernando Marqués
  Rufino

Competitions

La Liga

League table

Matches

Topscorers
  Fernando Torres – 15
  Sergio Agüero – 6
  Maxi Rodríguez – 6
  Maniche – 4
  Luciano Galletti – 4

Copa del Rey

Matches

Topscorers
  Sergio Agüero – 1
  Fernando Torres – 1

References

Atlético Madrid seasons
Atletico Madrid